was a general in the Imperial Japanese Army and Governor-General of Korea between 1936 and 1942. He was convicted of war crimes and sentenced to life imprisonment.

Life
Born to an ex-samurai family in Hiji, Ōita Prefecture, Minami came to Tokyo as a boarding student, and was eventually accepted into the Imperial Japanese Army Academy. After graduating from the academy in February 1895, he was commissioned as a second lieutenant in the cavalry in May. He was promoted to lieutenant in October 1897 and to captain in November 1900.

Minami served in the Russo-Japanese War as a member of the headquarters staff and as a company commander in the 1st Cavalry Regiment, where he participated in the Siege of Port Arthur. He was promoted to major in March 1905 and to lieutenant colonel in February 1910. Promoted to colonel in August 1915, he commanded the IJA 13th Cavalry Regiment during from 1914 to 1917, during World War I. He was Chief of the Cavalry Section of the Ministry of War from 1917 to 1919.

Attaining the rank of major general in July 1919, Minami served as commander of the IJA 3rd Cavalry Brigade in 1921–1923, then as Commandant of the Cavalry School in 1922–1923, and returned to the Imperial Japanese Army Academy as its commandant in 1923-1924.

Minami was promoted to lieutenant general in February 1924 and commanded the IJA 16th Division from 1926 to 1927. After serving as Vice Chief Imperial Japanese Army General Staff from 1927 to 1929, he became Commander-in-Chief of the Chosen Army from 1929 to 1930. He was promoted to full general in March 1930.

Returning to Japan, Minami was appointed Minister of War in the Wakatsuki Cabinet in 1931. As War Minister, his role dispatched Major General Yoshitsugu Tatekawa to Manchuria specifically to curb the militarist behaviors of the Kwantung Army, but the Mukden Incident took place to worsen Sino-Japanese relations before Tatekawa could act. Minami was War Minister during the Imperial Colors Incident.

Minami served as a member of the Supreme War Council from 1931 to 1934. He then received a posting as Commander of the Kwangtung Army from 1934 to 1936 during which he was concurrently Japanese ambassador to Manchukuo.

Minami was placed on the reserve list in 1936, after the February 26 Incident, and forced into retirement from active service.

However, in 1936, Minami was appointed 8th Governor-General of Korea between 1936 and 1942. His tenure in Korea was marked by a more hardline approach than his predecessors, with a rolling back of various liberal reforms of the 1920s. In addition, Minami outlawed all but one of the Korean-language newspapers and strongly pushed for the soshi-kamei policy.

After his term in Korea, Minami served as a member of the Privy Council from 1942 to 1945 and had a seat in the House of Peers in the Japanese Diet in 1945.
 
After World War II, Minami was arrested by the American Occupation authorities and brought before the International Military Tribunal for the Far East. He was convicted only of Counts 1 and 27, of being a leader in the plan to wage an unprovoked war of aggression against China, largely since he was Minister of War at the time of the Manchurian Incident. However, he was acquitted of waging a war of aggression against the United States, the British Commonwealth, and the Netherlands and was also acquitted of two charges related to prisoner abuse.  He was sentenced to life in prison but was paroled in 1954 on the grounds of his health. He died a year later.

References

Books

Notes

External links

|-

Japanese generals
Japanese colonial governors and administrators
1874 births
1955 deaths
Governors-General of Korea
Members of the House of Peers (Japan)
Members of the Kwantung Army
Japanese military personnel of the Russo-Japanese War
Japanese people convicted of war crimes
Japanese people convicted of the international crime of aggression
Japanese prisoners sentenced to life imprisonment
People convicted by the International Military Tribunal for the Far East
Prisoners sentenced to life imprisonment by international courts and tribunals
People of the Kwantung Leased Territory
People from Ōita Prefecture
Japanese anti-communists
People paroled from life sentence
Japanese politicians convicted of crimes